Coscinium is an extinct genus of prehistoric bryozoans in the family Hexagonellidae. The species C. elegans is from the Paleozoic rocks of the western states and territories.

See also 
 List of prehistoric bryozoan genera

References

External links 

 
 

Stenolaemata genera
Prehistoric bryozoan genera
Cystoporida
Paleozoic life of Ontario
Extinct bryozoans